Paul Bunyan Statue is a  concrete and metal sculpture of mythical logger Paul Bunyan in the Kenton neighborhood of Portland, Oregon, United States. It was built in 1959 to commemorate the centennial of Oregon's statehood during the Centennial Exposition and International Trade Fair, which was held in the Kenton area.

History
The sculpture was originally prominently placed at the intersection of North Interstate Avenue (then U.S. Route 99) and North Argyle Street, and now stands at the corner of North Interstate and North Denver, 59 feet south of its original location. It was listed on the National Register of Historic Places in January 2009.

The statue was the Highlighted Property of the Week when the National Park Service released its weekly list of February 6, 2009.

See also

 1959 in art
 National Register of Historic Places listings in North Portland, Oregon
 Statues of Paul Bunyan

References

External links
 

1959 establishments in Oregon
1959 sculptures
Colossal statues in the United States
Culture of Portland, Oregon
Kenton, Portland, Oregon
National Register of Historic Places in Portland, Oregon
Novelty buildings in Oregon
Outdoor sculptures in Portland, Oregon
Paul Bunyan
Relocated buildings and structures in Oregon
Sculptures of men in Oregon
Statues in Portland, Oregon
Statues of fictional characters